Marius Coman (born 31 July 1996) is a Romanian professional footballer who plays as a forward for Corvinul Hunedoara.

Honours

Club
FCM Baia Mare
Liga III : 2014–15
CFR Cluj
Liga I: 2017–18

References

External links
 
 

1996 births
Living people
Romanian footballers
Association football forwards
Liga I players
Liga II players
CS Minaur Baia Mare (football) players
LPS HD Clinceni players
CFR Cluj players
FC Universitatea Cluj players
CSM Reșița players
CS Academica Recea players
FC Petrolul Ploiești players
Liga III players
CS Corvinul Hunedoara players